The Challenge: Vendettas is the thirty-first season of MTV reality competition series, The Challenge. The official trailer was shown during the special mini-series Champs vs. Stars. For the first time, this season featured alumni from the US version of Big Brother, and the UK TV shows Ex on the Beach and Geordie Shore, competing with alumni from the regular shows of The Real World, Road Rules, The Challenge, and Are You the One?. For the first time ever, there was only one winner.

Contestants

Format
28 players – each with unresolved grudges with other contestants – compete to survive in the game and win their share of $500,000. Each round is designated as a male, female or genderless round. The main elements of the game are as follows: 

Daily Missions: Each round, the players compete in a challenge. The challenges vary between individual and team challenges. The winners split $25,000 for their individual bank accounts. 
In an individual challenge, the three best performers in the challenge form the Troika, while the worst-performer of the designated gender is nominated for elimination.
In team challenges, the winning team elects the Troika among themselves, while the losing team must vote immediately and publicly for a teammate of the designated gender to face elimination.  
Troika & Inquisition:  The three players in the Troika are immune from entering the Elimination Round. They nominate three players of the designated gender for the Elimination Round. The nominees face the "Inquisition", where they have the chance to plead their case to the Troika as to why they should not be voted-in to the Elimination Round.
Elimination Rounds (The Ring): In "The Ring", the Troika votes for one of the players who faced the Inquisition to compete in the Elimination Round. The winners stay in the game, and earn a "Grenade". Grenades hold power that can be used on any other player by the elimination winner. The losers of the elimination round go home, and their individual bank accounts total is added to the final prize fund.

When eight players remain, they compete individually in the Final Challenge for their share of the $500,000 prize. Only the Top 4 players win the money in their bank account. Additionally, first place is awarded the money from the bank accounts of every eliminated player as well as an additional $150,000. Second place receives an additional $35,000, third place an additional $10,000 and the fourth place an additional $5,000. The other four finalists receive nothing.

Twists
Purges: Some challenges are designated as Purges, where the worst competitors are immediately eliminated. 
 In the opening "Get Off the Rock" challenge, the worst-performing male and female are eliminated.
 In the "Help Me, Rhonda" challenge, the worst-performing male and female are eliminated.
 Due to uneven ratio of Males to Females, the "Outside the Box" challenge is also a Male Purge, with the worst-finishing male being eliminated. 
Mercenaries: For some of the Elimination Rounds, the nominated players face the Mercenaries instead of each other. The Mercenaries are experienced veterans, returning to The Challenge for a one-off challenge. Mercenary rounds occur during rounds that feature both a male and female elimination. A player winning against the Mercenary stays in the game, losing against the Mercenary eliminates the player. This means that all four or none of the nominated players could be eliminated depending on the results of each heat.
 In the "Crazy 8" Elimination Round, the female nominees face either Aneesa Ferreira (The Real World: Chicago) or Tori Deal (Are You the One? 4). The male nominees face either Derrick Kosinski (Road Rules: X-Treme) or Jordan Wiseley (The Real World: Portland).
 In the "Yankin' My Chain" challenge, the female nominees face either Ashley Mitchell (Real World: Ex-Plosion) or Laurel Stucky (The Challenge: Fresh Meat II). The male nominees face either Darrell Taylor (Road Rules: Campus Crawl) or Frank Sweeney (The Real World: San Diego).

Gameplay

Challenge games
 Get Off the Rock: This purge challenge is an overnight endurance race up the 1400-foot Rock of Gibraltar. For the first phase, contestants race through the streets of Gibraltar to a checkpoint in tunnels at the base of the rock, where they then must stand in a subway car overnight holding weighted boxes. The following day, players continue the race up the Rock of Gibraltar with staggered starts based on how they finished the first phase. The first-place finisher wins $25,000, while the slowest male and female contestants are immediately eliminated.
 Winner: Joss
 Eliminated: Nicole R. & Rogan
 Who's Got Balls?: Played in two heats, male and female, contestants must dive into a soapy pit and retrieve soccer balls, pull themselves back out of the pit using ropes, and deposit the balls into their respective bin. The first contestant to deposit three balls into their bin wins.
 Winners: Bananas & Britni
 #Vendettas: Played on a giant hashtag structure lifted above water, this challenge is played in heats separated by gender. Contestants must take their 4 "hashtag" figures, and place them onto 4 separate opponents' poles. The fastest male and female to place their hashtags on their opponents' poles and make it back to their own pole win the challenge.
 Winners: Devin & Natalie 
 Food Wars: Contestants are divided into 7 teams of 3 and 1 team of 2. At the beginning of each round, they are asked a question, and the first team to buzz in is allowed to answer. If they get it right, they win that question and will then be able to select one other team to be safe from eating while every other team has to select a member to consume a food of the winning choosing team's choosing. If the members of the eating team are unable to finish their dish in the allotted time, their team is eliminated. The final round between the final two teams is an eating competition, with the first team to finish the dish winning.
Winners: Marie, Tony & Zach
 Gasping for Air: Played at night, contestants are divided into 4 teams. Each contestant takes a turn diving underwater down 15 feet, and then moving a metal ring along a rope stretched 150 feet underwater. There are three checkpoint stations for the contestants to stop and breathe out of oxygen tanks while underwater. The team that moves their rings the overall longest distance wins.
Winners: Bananas, Kailah, Kyle, Tony & Zach
 Puppet Master: Contestants are split into two teams and are chained together in one long chain. While chained together, contestants must work together to assemble pieces of a giant puppet together (with Aneesa and CT heads). The first team to do so, and pull the rope raising their puppet, wins.
Winners: Bananas, Brad, Cara Maria, Jemmye, Kayleigh, Kyle, Natalie, Nicole Z., Shane & Tony
 Car Crash: This challenge entails five cars that are lifting into the air over water and are being sprayed with water. Contestants are separated into 4 teams. Each member of the team must jump from car to car, going through the backseat once completing the jump. The team with the fastest contestant to complete the jumps wins.
Winners: Bananas, Cara Maria, Natalie & Nelson
 Kicking Ass: Contestants are divided into two teams and are playing a game of soccer. However, they will be playing on pogo stilts while in giant plastic bubbles. The first team to score two goals on their opponents wins.
Winners: Brad, Kailah, Kam, Kyle, Natalie, Nicole Z., Tony & Zach
 This Land Is My Land:  Competitors are split into three teams. Each team has to stack up forty-five palates in order to raise their flag. Each team is split into three groups: Fabricators, who stack the palates; Suppliers, in charge of supplying the palates by running the palates that roamers supply them to the Fabricators; and Roamers, who must run across the beach and are in charge of supplying the Suppliers through a reservoir or stealing from other teams. The first team to stack their palates and raise their flag wins.
Winners: Britni, Natalie, Nicole Z., Tony & Zach
 Spanish Treasure: Contestants are divided into two teams. Each competitor on the team has to go one at a time to swim over to retrieve a ball. The competitor then has to dive down underwater and place the ball into a net attached to a treasure chest, elevating it slightly. They then swim back and touch a checkpoint before the next competitor on their team can go. Once the chest is brought up to the surface, the team is allowed to bring it back to shore, ending the mission. The team who does this the fastest wins.
Winners: Brad, Devin, Jemmye, Natalie, Nicole Z., Tony & Zach
 Help Me, Rhonda: This is an individual endurance competition. Competitors each have to race one mile up a hill towards Puente Nuevo bridge, where they then have to zipline across a chasm. They then have to run through the streets of Ronda back towards the bridge, before rappelling down the side of the bridge and then running to the finish line. The fastest male and female contestants win, while the slowest male and female contestants are eliminated.
Winners: Nicole Z. & Zach
Eliminated: Devin & Jemmye
 Outside the Box: Played individually, players are hooked to a moving semi-truck and forced to traverse from the truck to a dangling pillar with stacked boxes in-between. Players push themselves, alternating between the truck and pillars, weaving between the stacks of boxes. The boxes have varying point values, and if the player knocks over the stack of boxes, those points are added to their overall score. In addition, if a player fails to make the transfer, they will receive a transfer penalty. Those with the fewest points wins and gets an automatic ticket into the final challenge. The last place male (due to an uneven number of male and female competitors remaining) is eliminated.
Winners: Kailah & Tony
Eliminated: Nelson

Ring games
Balls of Fire: Placed on opposite sides of the Ring in front of two goals, players must kick soccer balls through a wall of fire into their opponent's goal. The player to score the best of three will win and earn a grenade. In the event that nobody can score a goal for an extended period of time the game will be played in a sudden death round. 
 Played by: Cory vs. Nelson
Chain Reaction: Players will start at the bottom of a chain ladder with only one rung connected on it and the remaining ones disconnected. On TJ's signal, players must build the rungs one by one while climbing their ladder until they can reach a bell. The first player to ring the bell will win and earn a grenade. 
 Played by: Alicia vs. Melissa
Oil and Water: Players will be placed in an oil pit and must retrieve a ball that TJ will drop down a peg board. Once they have retrieved the ball they must bring it back and score it in their basket. During this elimination players must remain on their hands and knees at all time unless they are about to score. Each basket will earn a point and the first player to score three points will win and earn a grenade. 
Played by: Melissa vs. Sylvia
Troubled Water: Players will be in a tank of water. They will have to use their bodies to remove water until they get to the red line. Once they get to the red line, they will use a hammer to break the bottom of the tank and escape the tank. The first player to do so will win and earn a grenade. 
Played by: Brad vs. Victor
Crazy 8: Players will race for a ring in the shape of a figure 8. They must do whatever it takes to get the ring to their side. The first player to get the ring to their side twice will win the elimination. In an unexpected twist, four "Mercenaries" (Jordan, Derrick, Tori, and Aneesa) were brought in to compete against the players in the Ring. In order to stay in the game, they must win against the Mercenary. The players who win against their Mercenary will stay in the game and earn a grenade. 
Played by: Jordan vs. Shane, Aneesa vs. Veronica, Kam vs. Tori, Derrick vs. Joss
Basket Case: Players will start locked inside of a Spanish basket. On TJ's signal players must claw, smash, and tear their way out of their basket as quickly as they can. Once they have left their basket, players must run to their puzzle board and complete it as quickly as possible. The first player to successfully complete their puzzle will win and earn a grenade. 
Played by: Kailah vs. Marie
Not So Bright: Players will each start in front of their podiums facing their puzzle board. On TJ's signal they will press the button on their podium causing the lights on their board to partially light up. The players must then run to their board and flip the switches for those lights that are off. The puzzle board only remains lit when a player is touching their button so the players will have to memorize which switches need to be turned on without accidentally turning any off. The first player to successfully light their puzzle board in its entirety will win and earn a grenade. 
Played by: Bananas vs. Devin
Yankin’ My Chain: Players will start harnessed together, back-to-back, on a circular track. On TJ's signal players must run around the track to reach a bell that is on their opponent's side. The first player to reach and ring their bell will win. In another twist, four more "Mercenaries" (Frank, Darrell, Ashley, and Laurel) were brought in to compete against the players in the Ring. In order to stay in the game, they must win against the Mercenary. The players who win against their Mercenary will stay in the game and earn a grenade. 
Played by: Brad vs. Frank, Ashley vs. Kam, Darrell vs. Nelson, Britni vs. Laurel
Spanish Torture: Players will be tied and harnessed to two ropes running across the ring, one for their hands and one for their feet. On TJ's signal, players must shimmy across these ropes as quickly as they can in order to ring a bell at the end. The first player to make it across and ring their bell will win and earn a grenade. 
Played by: Kam vs. Natalie
Head Banger: Players will start on either side of a wall and, on TJ's signal, will charge through two walls as quickly as possible. After breaking through the second wall players will find two oversized balls that they must use to smash through a metal grate that will reveal two smaller balls that must be deposited in their tube. The first player to deposit both smaller balls into their tube will win and return to the game and earn their ticket to the final challenge. 
Played by: Brad vs. Leroy

Final Challenge
First Stage: In the first stage of the final challenge, players must run along a course and complete three checkpoints. Before attempting each checkpoint players must retrieve a token found at the end of the mile and a half long course. Additionally, players will be required to wear various pieces of medieval equipment that will slow them down. For the lap to the first checkpoint players feet will be shackled together by chains. For the lap to the final checkpoint, players must each wear an entire suit of armor while they finish the course. The first two male players and first two female players to complete the stage will advance to Stage 2. The remaining four players will be eliminated from the final challenge and their bank accounts will be added to the final prize.
Checkpoints
This is Torch'er: Each player will start with their own basket of torches. One at a time, players must take their entire basket of torches to the opposite end of the muddy field. Once a player has moved all of their torches they may advance to the next checkpoint.
Grenade: Players may simply return to their basket after depositing their torch or they may take a torch from their opponent's basket and return it to their starting basket before retrieving their own torch.
Decked Out: Players will enter a dungeon where they will face either Bananas or Melissa who serve as Mercenaries. The Mercenaries serve as card dealers and each player must guess whether the next card will be higher or lower than the first, aces being high. If the player correctly guesses two of three cards they will advance to the final checkpoint. If the Mercenary wins they will be responsible for assigning the player a grenade that they must complete before advancing.
Grenade: If a Mercenary won, they could decide between drinking a glass of water, completing 50 jumping jacks or burying a log in the ground, as a grenade for their opponent. 
Backstabber: Upon reaching the checkpoint each player must wait for the next of their fellow players to arrive before playing. Competing one on one, one by one, players must remove swords from their board in amounts of one, two, or three. The player with one sword remaining on their board will win and advance to the finish line. (Note: Because Nicole Z. was disqualified due to an injury, Kam, the last person to arrive to the checkpoint. simply had to remove all of the swords before advancing.)
Grenade: The winner will also assign their opponent one of three ancient dishes; cheese, hot chocolate, or spicy tripe soup, to consume before being able to advance.
Eliminated: Kam, Leroy, Tony, Nicole Z. (DQ)

Memory Smash: In the second stage of the final challenge players must memorize a puzzle key featuring various colored circles. Once they have memorized a portion of their puzzle they must go inside the castle and to the courtyard where they must recreate the puzzle on their own individual board. The first male and female to finish stage 1 were given a 30-second head start. The first player to successfully match their color board with the answer key will be declared the winner and receive over $370,000, money from both the final prize and also the cumulated bank accounts of all of the eliminated players. Second, third, and fourth place will each receive $35,000, $10,000, and $5,000 respectively. Each finalist will also receive the money earned from their bank accounts throughout the season. The results would later be announced at the reunion special.

Final results
Winner: Cara Maria ($378,750)
Runner-up: Zach ($72,125)
Third place: Kyle ($20,625)
Fourth place: Kailah ($25,625)

Game summary

Elimination chart

Game progress

Competition
 The contestant won the final challenge
 The contestant did not win the final challenge
 The contestant finished in the bottom 4, after being eliminated on the first leg of the final challenge
 The contestant won the challenge and was part of the Troika
 The contestant did not win the challenge but placed in the Top 3 and was part of the Troika
 The contestant won the challenge, but was not part of the Troika or nominated for the Inquisition
 The contestant won the challenge and was nominated by the Troika for the Inquisition, but was not selected for the elimination round
 The contestant was not selected for the elimination round
 The contestant was nominated by the Troika for the Inquisition, but was not selected for the elimination round
 The contestant won the Ring
 The contestant's elimination in the Ring was deemed a draw, but they were not eliminated
 The contestant lost the Ring and was eliminated
 The contestant won the challenge, but was selected for the Ring, lost and was eliminated
 The contestant was eliminated at the challenge
 The contestant was removed from the competition due to medical reasons
 The contestant withdrew from the competition
 The contestant left the competition for undisclosed reasons

Bank progress

Note: Dollar amounts in bold indicate that contestant finished in the Top 4 with that amount, and won it in the final challenge.
Note: Dollar amounts in italics indicate that contestant was eliminated with that amount, and lost it upon elimination. The total amount was added to the Additional Bank, which was given to the winner.
Additional Bank: $220,000

Competition
 The contestant won the final challenge
 The contestant did not win the final challenge
 The contestant finished in the bottom 4, after being eliminated on the first leg of the final challenge
 The contestant won the challenge and was part of the Troika
 The contestant did not win the challenge but placed in the Top 3 and was part of the Troika
 The contestant won the challenge, but was not part of the Troika or nominated for the Inquisition
 The contestant won the challenge and was nominated by the Troika for the Inquisition, but was not selected for the elimination round
 The contestant was not selected for the elimination round
 The contestant was nominated by the Troika for the Inquisition, but was not selected for the elimination round
 The contestant won the Ring
 The contestant's elimination in the Ring was deemed a draw, but they were not eliminated
 The contestant lost the Ring and was eliminated
 The contestant won the challenge, but was selected for the Ring, lost and was eliminated
 The contestant was eliminated at the challenge
 The contestant was removed from the competition due to injury/illness
 The contestant withdrew from the competition
 The contestant left the competition for undisclosed reasons

Voting progress

Bold indicates the contestant was in the Troika

Team selections

Grenades

Episodes

Reunion special
The two-part reunion special/finale aired on April 10 and 17, 2018, and was hosted by WWE pro wrestler, The Real World: Back to New York alum, and former Challenge champion Mike "The Miz" Mizanin. Cast members (including Kayleigh, Melissa and Kyle via Satellite) attended at the MTV Studios in New York City.

Notes

References

External links
 

Vendettas, The Challenge
2018 American television seasons
Television shows set in Gibraltar
Television shows set in Spain
Television shows set in the Czech Republic
Television shows filmed in the United Kingdom
Television shows filmed in Spain
Television shows filmed in the Czech Republic